Robert Latz (July 15, 1930 – April 19, 2022) was an American politician in the state of Minnesota. He served in the Minnesota House of Representatives from 1959–1962 and 1963–1966. He was an attorney and served as Assistant Attorney General of Minnesota from 1955 to 1958.

References

1930 births
2022 deaths
People from Hibbing, Minnesota
Lawyers from Minneapolis
Politicians from Minneapolis
University of Minnesota alumni
Members of the Minnesota House of Representatives